The Whig government of the United Kingdom of Great Britain and Ireland that began in November 1830 and ended in November 1834 consisted of two ministries: the Grey ministry (from 1830 to July 1834) and then the first Melbourne ministry.

History
The first wholly Whig government since 1783 came to power after the Duke of Wellington's Tory government lost a vote of no confidence on 15 November 1830. The government, led by the Earl Grey, passed the Great Reform Act in 1832, which brought about parliamentary reform, and enacted the  Slavery Abolition Act 1833, bringing about the abolition of slavery in most of the British Empire.

However, King William IV dismissed Grey's successor Lord Melbourne in 1834 and asked Sir Robert Peel to form a government. Peel was out of the country at the time, so the Duke of Wellington formed a caretaker government.

Cabinets

The Earl Grey's Cabinet, November 1830 – July 1834

The Viscount Melbourne's Cabinet, July 1834 – November 1834

List of ministers
Members of the Cabinet are indicated by bold face.

Notes

References
C. Cook and B. Keith, British Historical Facts 1830–1900

1830-1834
Government
1830 establishments in the United Kingdom
1834 disestablishments in the United Kingdom
1830s in the United Kingdom
Ministries of William IV of the United Kingdom
Cabinets established in 1830
Cabinets disestablished in 1834